Saignon is a commune in the Vaucluse department in the Provence-Alpes-Côte d'Azur region in southeastern France.
The nearest town is Apt.

There is a bakery/cafe, two restaurants, and a general store.  The school has about 100 students. Saignon has a post office.

History
The area was first occupied in the Middle Palaeolithic age. The rock at Saignon, on a prominent location over the valley, was used as an ancient observatory and possibly a signal station.  The name Saignon is believed to derive from the word "Sagnio", which comes from "signum".

Saignon had three châteaus built in 946, 976 and 1032.

The 12th century Romanesque church of Notre-Dame de Pitié, also known as Saint Mary of Saignon, has been a stopping point for religious pilgrims since the Middle Ages: in addition to local pilgrims from Provence, it was positioned on the way for those traveling to Rome along the Via Domitia, and for Italian pilgrims going to Santiago de Compostela in Spain.

The 11th century Benedictine Abbaye Saint-Eusèbe, located just outside the town, traces its history to an earlier 6th century structure.  After being destroyed and rebuilt several times, the Lord of Saignon restored the abbey to the Order of Saint Giles, which received support from the Benedictine Cluny Abbey and its abbot, St. Odilon.  Pope Urban II passed through the area in 1096 and devoted the church which had been recently rebuilt. The abbey is now rented to the public for events. A conference was held in 2004 celebrating the 1000 anniversary of the abbey (founded in 1004).

Geography
The Calavon forms the commune's north-eastern border.

See also
 Côtes du Luberon AOC
Communes of the Vaucluse department
Luberon

References

External links

Saignon's official website

Communes of Vaucluse